Benjina-Nangasuri Airport is an airport in Benjina, Maluku, Indonesia.

There are no regularly scheduled flights to this airport, but chartered or private planes can land at this air strip.

Benjina is located in on the west side of the Aru Islands, south of the city of Dobo, on the island of Maikoor.

References

Airports in Maluku